A tubular tyre, referred to as a tub in Britain, a sew-up in the US, a single in Australia, or just a tubular is a bicycle tyre that is stitched closed around the inner tube to form a torus. The combination is then glued (sometimes with two-sided tape) onto a specially designed rim, referred to as a "sprint rim" in Britain, and just a "tubular rim" in the US, of a bicycle wheel.

Tubular tyres require more labour to repair a puncture than clincher tyres (wired–on in Britain). The tyre must be removed from the rim, opened up, patched, sewn back up, then finally glued back to the rim. Clinchers have largely replaced tubulars for amateur racing (although they have seen a revival due to the carbon rim being better suited to tubular design), but tubulars are still commonly used for indoor track racing (where the closed track makes punctures from road debris less commonplace), professional road racing, road time trials, and cyclo-cross racing.

The resulting combination was either slightly lighter or stronger than more common clincher tyres  until the clincher tyres and rims technology caught up in recent years. Taken as a whole the total weight of a tubular rim and tyre is always lighter than its clincher equivalent. However, for all non-racing purposes the lightness advantage is somewhat offset by the need to carry at least one entire spare tubular tyre (only a patch kit or inner tube are needed if using clincher tyres). Yet the extra weight—and more importantly, rotational inertia—is off the wheel, which therefore accelerates more easily. Advances in tire sealant have made carrying an extra tire a bit outdated.

Other advantages of this system include a decreased chance of pinch flats, an ability to operate with a wider range of tyre pressures (from 25 to 200 psi), and increased safety in the event of a flat at high speed because a properly glued on tubular tyre is less likely to roll off the rim.

A further advantage is that because a tubular tyre is an inner tube within the outer tyre casing, it is a "closed system," meaning in the event of a flat the air typically escapes far less quickly than with a clincher. For this reason tubulars are generally regarded as safer to ride than clinchers on fast mountain descents. Conversely, they are also regarded as being less safe on long or fast descents, because the heat generated by braking can cause the glue holding the tire to the rim to fail, or the tire to explode.

Tubular tyres are fitted with Presta valves.

A tubeless tubular, with an integrated airtight liner instead of a separate inner tube, was introduced in 2009.

Gallery

References

Tires